The Truong Son muntjac or Annamite muntjac (Muntiacus truongsonensis) is a species of muntjac deer. It was discovered in the Truong Son mountain range in Vietnam in 1997.

It was identified by examination of skulls and descriptions provided by villagers, who call it samsoi cacoong, or "the deer that lives in the deep, thick forest." It lives at altitudes of 400–1000 metres, where its small size allows it to move through dense undergrowth.

References

 Truong Son Muntjac, WWF Indochina.
 Animal Info - Truong Son Muntjac
 
 

Muntjac
Mammals of Vietnam
Mammals described in 1997